is a railway station in Otaru, Hokkaido, Japan, operated by Hokkaido Railway Company (JR Hokkaido). The station is numbered S12.

Lines
Asari Station is served by the Hakodate Main Line

Station layout
The station consists of two ground-level opposed side platforms connected by a footbridge, serving two tracks. The station has automated ticket machines and Kitaca card readers. The station is unattended.

Platforms

Adjacent stations

History
The station opened on November 28, 1880, as a flag station.

The area around the station was used as a location in the 2008 music video for Death Cab for Cutie's "I Will Possess Your Heart".

See also
 List of railway stations in Japan

References

Railway stations in Otaru
Railway stations in Japan opened in 1880